Anoratha sinuosa is a moth of the family Erebidae first described by Wileman and South in 1916. It is found in Taiwan.

References

Moths described in 1916
Hypeninae
Moths of Taiwan